The Militia of Great Britain were the principal military reserve forces of the Kingdom of Great Britain during the 18th century.

For the period following the creation of the United Kingdom of Great Britain and Ireland in 1801, see Militia (United Kingdom).

England
Following the restoration of Charles II in 1660, Parliament passed several acts empowering the Lord Lieutenant of each county to appoint officers and raise men for a militia force. Although the King commanded the forces, they were not centrally funded. The burden of supplying men and equipment fell on property owners, in proportion to their income from land or their property value. The militia could be called out for local police actions, to keep the peace, and in the event of a national emergency. It played a role in coastal defence during the second and third Anglo-Dutch Wars between 1665 and 1674, and contributed to the defeat of the Duke of Monmouth in 1685.

Great Britain
The militia's usefulness as a military force, never great, declined thereafter, until by the middle of the 18th century it required a major overhaul. This was achieved by the Militia Acts 1757–1762, passed as a response to the threat of a French invasion during the Seven Years' War. Responsibility for raising and organising the force remained at county level, but funding was provided by central government. Officers were to be appointed from among the property-owning class. Men were to be chosen by ballot among the able-bodied men of the parish between the ages of 18 and 50, and would serve for three years (soon extended to five). If they wished not to serve, they could either provide a substitute or pay a £10 fine.  

There was considerable opposition to the reforms, both in parliament and in the country at large. Riots occurred in Yorkshire, Lincolnshire and elsewhere in 1757. These stemmed chiefly from an ill-informed fear that conscription and compulsory foreign service were being covertly introduced. In fact, the acts, which applied in England and Wales only, restricted service to the territory of Great Britain. However some militia regiments did volunteer for service in Ireland during the Rebellion of 1798.   

Local opposition to the acts resulted in some counties being slow to implement them. Six counties – Derbyshire, Nottinghamshire, Oxfordshire, Staffordshire, Sussex and Worcestershire – were in default for many years, also defaulting on a large part of the fines imposed on them in consequence. The American Revolution, which drained the country of regular troops, provided the stimulus that brought the defaulters into line. By 1778 all English and Welsh counties had embodied their militias.    

Training of the disembodied militia took place over a period of several weeks each year, outside which officers and men would be largely free to pursue their civilian lives. When embodied, regiments would normally be quartered in public houses or barracks where available. Camps were also an option, and these were often sizeable affairs which brought troops together in large numbers for strategic and training purposes. 

Although overseas service was excluded from the militia's duties, embodied regiments were usually required to serve away from their home counties, and were frequently moved from one station to another. This was intended to reduce the risk of the men sympathising with the populace if they were required to quell civil unrest. Pay and conditions were similar to those of the regular army, with the additional benefit of money for family dependants. Unlike the army, the militia had no cavalry or, until 1853, artillery. 

The militia was constitutionally separate from the army, but from the 1790s militiamen were encouraged to volunteer for the army, and did so in large numbers. During the French Revolutionary Wars the militia expanded to a total strength of 82,000 men in February 1799, reducing to 66,000 through a Parliamentary act of that year designed to reinforce the regular army by encouraging militia volunteers through the offer of bounties for enlistment. 

In 1802 peace with France led to the disembodying of the militia, which was embodied again in 1803, when hostilities resumed. Britain's increasing overseas troop commitments during the Napoleonic Wars resulted in growing pressure on recruitment for the militia, both for home defence and as a feeder for the army. During the period to 1815, 110,000 men transferred to line regiments as against 36,000 prior to 1802. The militia continued to serve as a coastal defence force, as well as guarding dockyards and prisoners of war, and performing other duties including riot control during the Luddite unrest of 1811–1813. It was disembodied in 1815 but balloting continued until 1831.

List of militia regiments
An incomplete list includes:

Berkshire Militia
Brecknockshire Militia
Royal Buckinghamshire Militia (King's Own) 
Cambridgeshire Militia
Cardiganshire Militia
Carmarthenshire Militia
Carnarvon Militia
Denbigh Militia
Derbyshire Blues
Devon Militia (four regiments)
Dorset Militia
Durham Militia (two regiments)
Edinburgh Militia
Flintshire Militia
Glamorgan Militia
Gloucestershire Militia (two regiments)
North Hants Militia
Hertfordshire Militia

Kent Militia (two regiments)
Royal Lancashire Militia (seven regiments)
Royal London Militia (two regiments)
Middlesex Militia (five regiments)
Royal Montgomeryshire Militia
Norfolk Militia
Northampton Militia
Northampton and Rutland Militia
Northumberland Militia
Nottinghamshire Militia
Oxfordshire Militia
Rutland Militia
Somerset Militia (two regiments)
West Suffolk Militia
Royal Surrey Militia (three regiments)
Sussex Militia
Royal Wiltshire Militia
East York Militia

Further reading
Cookson, J. E. The British armed nation 1793–1815. Oxford, 1997. 
Fortescue, J. W. The county lieutenancies and the army, 1803–1814. London, 1909.
Gee, Austin. The British volunteer movement 1794–1814. Oxford, 2003. 
Knight, Roger. Britain against Napoleon: the organization of victory 1793–1815. London, 2014.
Western, J. R. The English militia in the eighteenth century: the story of a political issue 1660–1802. London, 1965.

Scottish militia
In the late 17th century, while the Kingdom of Scotland was still an independent country sharing a monarch with England, there were calls for the resurrection of the country's militia, with the understated aim of protecting the rights of Scots in Great Britain. A historical account of the debate which followed on Fletcher's work is given in John Robertson's 1985 The Scottish Enlightenment and the Militia Issue.

During the Jacobite rising of 1745 in Scotland, militias were raised in Argyll, the Isle of Skye and the northern counties. They are often confused with Loudon's Highlanders regiment and the Independent Highland Companies who also supported the Government. The Campbell of Argyll Militia also known as the Campbell militia, the Argyll militia, or the Argyllshire men, was an irregular militia unit formed in 1745 by John Campbell, 4th Duke of Argyll to oppose the rising.

Following the merger of Scotland into the new Kingdom of Great Britain, the British Militia Act 1757 did not apply in Scotland. There the traditional system continued, so that militia regiments existed in some places and not in others. This was resented by some, and the Militia Club, soon to become the Poker Club, was formed in Edinburgh to promote the raising of a Scottish militia. This and several other Edinburgh clubs became the crucible of the Scottish Enlightenment.

The Militia Act 1797 empowered the Lord Lieutenants of Scotland to raise and command militia regiments in each of the "Counties, Stewartries, Cities, and Places" under their jurisdiction. At first the Act was opposed due to some believing the militia ballot would be used to enable the Crown to remove men from Scotland.

Irish militia
The Parliament of Ireland passed an act in 1715 raising regiments of militia in each county and county corporate. Membership was restricted to Protestants between the ages of sixteen and sixty. In 1793, during the Napoleonic Wars, the Irish militia were reorganized to form thirty-seven county and city regiments. While officers of the reorganized force were all Protestants, membership of the other ranks was now opened up to members of all denominations, including Roman Catholics.

Channel Islands
 Royal Alderney Militia
 Royal Guernsey Militia
Royal Militia of the Island of Jersey
 Royal Sark Militia

See also
 Fencibles
 British Volunteer Corps
 Militia (British Dominions and Crown Colonies)
 Militia (United Kingdom)
 Yeomanry Cavalry

References

External links
 Regiments of the British West Indies and Bermuda 

Military history of Great Britain
18th-century history of the British Army
Militia of the United Kingdom